Maryvale is a rural locality in the Livingstone Shire, Queensland, Australia. In the  Maryvale had a population of 29 people.

History 
In the  Maryvale had a population of 29 people.

Education 
There are no schools in Maryvale. The nearest primary schools are Byfield State School in neighbouring Byfield to the north, Farnborough State School in Farnborough to the south-east, and Milman State School in Milman to the south-west. The nearest secondary school is Yeppoon State High School in Yeppoon to the south-west.

References 

Shire of Livingstone
Localities in Queensland